"Higher Power" is a song by British rock band Coldplay from their ninth album Music of the Spheres. It was released on 7 May 2021 as the lead single, being written by the band's four members, Federico Vindver and Denise Carite, while production was handled by Max Martin. Oscar Holter and Bill Rahko also helped to co-produce the song, which received generally positive reviews from music critics and was nominated for Best Pop Duo/Group Performance at the 64th Annual Grammy Awards.

Background
During an interview with Mark Savage of BBC News, lead vocalist Chris Martin, said that the song just dropped out the sky: "I came up with the title first, but struggled to find the melody and lyrics to go with it. Then one day I was staying in this place and the sink was very resonant. And so I started hitting the sink [to make] this beat... and then I went to the piano keyboard, and the song just landed in one go".

He also explained that "the song is about trying to find the astronaut in all of us, the person that can do amazing things". The singer later told Zoe Ball that the track had intergalactic origins, saying: "We've been trying to imagine what music might sound like on other planets, and try to imagine being those other acts, so we're not thinking of ourselves as being the band Coldplay from England", he explained.

Production 
The song was produced by Max Martin, who the band called "a true wonder of the universe". During its first stages, the song was recorded at Hansa Studios, in Berlin, Germany. Due to the COVID-19 pandemic, Martin sent material regularly to the rest of the band, who were working together with Max Martin, but he later joined the group, and most of the track was recorded during this time, later being properly recorded at MixStar Studios, in Virginia Beach, Virginia.

Promotion 
On 23 April 2021, a post from an account titled 'Alien Radio FM' on social media released a set of coordinates (51°30'24.6"N 0°08'34.4"W) that led to Green Park in Piccadilly, London. The post included a photo of an advertisement at these coordinates with unknown bright neon purple characters set to a blue background. The characters were quickly decoded by fan sites and said "Coldplay Higher Power May Seven". Similar posts would follow, which all teased the lead single, "Higher Power".

On 29 April 2021, Coldplay confirmed on their social media its title and release date, on 7 May.  On 20 July 2021, the band officially announced their ninth studio album Music of the Spheres, revealing that "Higher Power" would be the second song on the album's tracklist. The announcement also stated that an album track, entitled "Coloratura", would be released on 23 July, while the official second single will come out in September.

Music video
An audio visualizer for "Higher Power", which was directed by Paul Dugdale, premiered on Coldplay's YouTube channel at 12:01a.m. BST on 7 May 2021, coinciding with the single's release. Shot five days before the single's release, It features the band performing on an empty lot as alien holograms dance to the tune. Branded as a form of "extraterrestrial transmission", the band previewed the video to French European Space Agency astronaut Thomas Pesquet aboard the International Space Station prior to its public release. On 19 May, an official lyric video directed by Pilar Zeta and Victor Scorrano was released.

Two weeks later, Coldplay confirmed on their social media that the official version, which was directed by Dave Meyers, would be released on 8 June 2021. The official video was revealed to be the first as part of a three-part "melodic orbit", entitled Music of the Spheres, which was, at the time of release, rumoured to be the title of their ninth album. The phrase also refers to the intro track used in the official video, as well as during the Live at Worthy Farm livestream and their performance at BBC Radio 1's Big Weekend.  The video was choreographed by Seoul-based Kim Boram, and features members of his dance troupe, Ambiguous Dance Company.

On the music video, Chris Martin finds himself on a fictional post-apocalyptic planet named "Kaotica" and explores the planet's cities, where he finds animal and bug-like robots, giant holograms, and dances with a group of alien-like holograms. Their heads are instantly covered with blades and they hover in the air, giving Chris a powerful energy, and the rest of Coldplay members (Will Champion, Guy Berryman, Jonny Buckland) appear. It allows him to run in a higher speed and to fly into outer space.

Live performances
On 2 May 2021, the first live performance of "Higher Power" was announced to be held at American Idol's 9 May episode. The Official Charts Company informed on 3 May that the band would perform the track to open the 41st Brit Awards, which was recorded on a barge on the River Thames by The O2 Arena. Coldplay included the song, along with a track titled "Human Heart", on their set for Glastonbury Festival's special livestream event on 22 May, which was filmed at Worthy Farm. On 28 May, BBC Radio 1's Big Weekend released the band's performance of "Higher Power" recorded at Whitby Abbey in North Yorkshire, England. On 16 June, Coldplay performed the acoustic rendition live for the first time on The Tonight Show Starring Jimmy Fallon in New York City. On 11 July, the band performed the song on ASAP Natin 'To as part of their debut on Philippine television. On 25 September, Coldplay co-headlined the Global Citizen Festival in New York's Central Park, opening their set list with "Higher Power". On 23 October, Coldplay opened their set with "Higher Power" during Audacy's 8th annual We Can Survive charity concert held at the Hollywood Bowl in Los Angeles, California.

Critical reception 
"Higher Power" received generally positive reviews from music critics. Ella Kemp from NME rated the song 4/5 stars and noted that it "takes everything Chris Martin and co. have learned from a lifetime of dreaming and finally launches their talent into outer space – literally. 'Higher Power' is best appreciated through the sheer force of the melody, giving you the rush of hurtling into the atmosphere [...]. For a band so often shackled by their emotional transparency, [the song] is an exciting leap forward". Halle Kiefer from Vulture noted similarities with Steve Winwood's "Higher Love", while also complimenting the song by saying that "[in] comparison, 'Higher Power' wins out by a few hundred kilometers". The track was nominated for Best Pop Duo/Group Performance at the 64th Annual Grammy Awards on 23 November 2021,

Year-end lists

Credits and personnel
Credits and personnel adapted from Parlophone UK presented to YouTube.

Recording and management
 Recorded and mixed at MixStar Studios (Virginia Beach, Virginia).
 Mastered at Sterling Sound (New York City, New York).
 Published by Parlophone Records, under exclusive license to Warner Music Group.

Personnel

 Chris Martin – lead vocals, songwriting, keyboards, percussion
 Jonny Buckland – songwriting, guitar
 Guy Berryman – songwriting, bass guitar
 Will Champion – songwriting, drums, backing vocals
 Max Martin – songwriting, production, keyboards, programming, backing vocals
 Denise Carite – songwriting, choir vocalist
 Federico Vindver – songwriting, keyboards
 Oscar Holter – production, keyboards, programming
 Bill Rahko – production, additional vocals
 Rik Simpson – additional production
 Daniel Green – additional production
 Serban Ghenea – mixing engineer
 Randy Merrill – mastering engineer
 Apple Martin – additional vocals
 John Hanes – engineering
 Michael Ilbert – engineering
 Connor Panayi – assistant engineering
 Duncan Fuller – assistant engineering
 Karl-Ola Kjellholm – assistant engineering
 Linn Fijal – assistant engineering
 Tate McDowell – assistant engineering
 Love Choir – choir arrangement
 Stevie Mackey – choir vocalist
 Dorian Holley – choir vocalist
 Neka Hamilton – choir vocalist

Charts

Weekly charts

Year-end charts

Certifications

Release history

References 

2021 singles
2021 songs
Coldplay songs
Parlophone singles
Songs written by Chris Martin
Songs written by Guy Berryman
Songs written by Jonny Buckland
Songs written by Will Champion
Songs written by Max Martin
Song recordings produced by Max Martin
Ultratop 50 Singles (Flanders) number-one singles
Music videos directed by Dave Meyers (director)
Songs written by Federico Vindver